Moros y cristianos is a festival celebrated in parts of Spain.

Moros y cristianos may also refer to:
 Moros y Cristianos of Alcoy, a festival in Alcoy, Alicante, Spain
 Moros y Cristianos (dish), a Cuban recipe for black beans and white rice
 Moros y cristianos (television programme), a Spanish debate show aired between 1997 and 2001

See also
 Reconquista, centuries of battle between Christians and Muslims in Spain
 Moresca, a Spanish folk dance representing the battles between the Christians and Moors (Muslims)
 Moreška, a Croatian sword dance, originally representing Christians and Moors, but later changed to Turks and Moors in the 19th century